The city of Houston and its metropolitan area has a rich sporting culture and the area residents are active in many spectator and participant sports. Spectators attend events including teams from four major professional sports teams and collegiate sports. Participants enjoy activities from running in Memorial Park to sailing on Galveston Bay and Clear Lake. A number of other sports are also available, including nearly a dozen fencing clubs, ranging from recreational clubs to elite competitive organizations.

Major league sports
Houston has five professional major league teams: the Houston Astros (MLB), Houston Texans (NFL), Houston Rockets (NBA), Houston Dynamo FC (MLS), and Houston Dash (NWSL). Houston does not have an NHL and WNBA team.

The Astros have won two World Series titles in 2017 and 2022. In 2006, the Dynamo won the MLS Cup in their first year after moving from San Jose, California, and in 2007 became the first MLS franchise since 1997 to repeat a championship. Meanwhile, the Rockets obtained two championships in a similar fashion, winning back-to-back NBA titles in 1994 and 1995.

Minute Maid Park (home of the Astros) and Toyota Center (home of the Rockets) are located in Downtown Houston—contributing to an urban renaissance that has transformed Houston's center into a day-and-night destination. Also, the city has the first domed stadium in the United States, now known as the NRG Astrodome, and also holds the NFL's first retractable roof stadium—NRG Stadium. Other facilities for major league teams in Houston include Shell Energy Stadium, a soccer-specific stadium.

Other sports

Former teams

Houston was home to the now defunct WNBA Comets from 1997 to 2008. The Comets won 4 consecutive WNBA Championships, which is still the most championships of any sports team in Houston, and the biggest title streak in Texas.

The AFL/NFL Oilers called Houston home from 1960 to 1997 before the team moved to Tennessee and became the Titans. The Oilers also provided the city with 2 AFL championships in 1960 and 1961, before the merger with the NFL.

The Houston Aeros of the International Hockey League and the American Hockey League existed in Houston from 1994 until 2013 when they were moved to become the Iowa Wild. They won the Turner Cup (IHL) in 1999 and the Calder Cup (AHL) in 2003.

The Houston Aeros of the World Hockey Association played in Houston from 1972 to 1978 until the WHA dissolved.  They won the Avco World Trophy as champions of the WHA in 1974 and 1975.

Houston has three teams in World TeamTennis: The E-Z Riders in 1974, the Astro-Knots in 1982 and 1983, and the Wranglers from 2005 to 2007.

The Houston Scrap Yard Dawgs of the National Pro Fastpitch from 2016 to 2017 when the team terminated by NPF after they becoming the NPF champions in 2017.

College sports

Four Division I college athletic programs play within the city of Houston, and a fifth is located in the metropolitan area. A new venue, TDECU Stadium, opened in 2014 on the University of Houston campus at the former site of Robertson Stadium. Other college sports facilities in Houston are the Fertitta Center and Rice Stadium.

Annual events
Houston hosts annual sporting events such as the PGA Tour's Houston Open, the college football Texas Bowl, and college baseball's Houston College Classic.  Since 1971, Houston's two NCAA Division I FBS football teams, the Rice Owls and Houston Cougars have faced off in the annual Bayou Bucket Classic.  Since 1985, the Texas Southern Tigers and Prairie View A&M Panthers compete in the annual Labor Day Classic.

Every June since 2012, the U.S. national rugby team has played an international match against a top European team at BBVA Stadium, breaking attendance records for rugby matches in the U.S. The U.S. Men's Clay Court Championships, an ATP World Tour 250 series tournament, has been held in Houston since 2001.

From 1998 to 2001, the CART World Series held the Grand Prix of Houston auto race on downtown streets. CART's successor series, Champ Car, revived the race for 2006 and 2007 on the streets surrounding Reliant Park. The race was discontinued again in 2008, following Champ Car's merger with the rival IndyCar Series. The Grand Prix of Houston returned for the 2013 season. In motorcycling, the Astrodome hosted an AMA Supercross Championship round from 1974 to 2003 and the NRG Stadium since 2003.

Several annual sporting events are no longer held in Houston. The Virginia Slims of Houston was a women's tennis tournament held from 1970 to 1995 as part of the WTA Tour. The final official event of the LPGA golf season, the LPGA Tour Championship, was held in Houston in 2009, but moved to Orlando, Florida in 2010.

Other major events
In addition to the events listed below, Houston hosted the Masters Grand Prix in 1976 and the Tennis Masters Cup in 2003 and 2004. Houston is set to host multiple matches during the 2026 FIFA World Cup.

Intramural sports

Houston has a cricket league for adults which, in 2016, had 30 teams and with the majority of players being immigrants from cricket-oriented countries; this league was established in the 1970s. In 2013 the first cricket club for children, Katy Youth Cricket, was established. The first youth league, Triggers Colts Cricket League, was established in 2014, as was the Sugar Land Youth Cricket Club and the North West children's cricket club. In 2015 Energy Corridor Cricket, also a children's club, was established. In September 2018 a cricket complex in Prairie View was scheduled to open.

In 2020, during the COVID-19 pandemic in Texas, there was a renewed interest in roller skating in Houston.

References